Eremophila duttonii, commonly known as budda or harlequin fuchsia bush, is a flowering plant in the figwort family, Scrophulariaceae and is endemic to mainland Australia where it occurs in all the mainland states except Victoria. It is a shrub or small tree with dark green, sticky leaves and flowers that are red on top fading to yellow-green below. Extracts from this plant have been shown to have significant antimicrobial activity.

Description

The top of the petal tube is red to orange, fading to yellowish-green below and inside the tube. Occasionally the petal tube is all yellow. The tube often has a few short hairs inside and out and is sticky on the outside. The 4 stamens extend beyond the end of the tube.

Taxonomy and naming
Eremophila duttonii was first formally described in 1858 by Ferdinand von Mueller in Quarterly Journal and Transactions of the Pharmaceutical Society of Victoria. The specific epithet (duttonii) honours Francis Dutton, who was twice Premier of South Australia.

Distribution and habitat
The most westerly distribution of Eremophila duttonii is the Warburton area of Western Australia. It occurs in southern Northern Territory, South Australia, south-western Queensland and western New South Wales as far east as Broken Hill. It grows in red-brown sandy soils on plains and hills.

Uses

Indigenous use
The Arrente people who call the plant aherre-intenhe, collect the leaves for medicinal use. These uses included treatment of skin complaints, including those caused by the scabies mite. It was used as a gargle for sore throat and for painful eye and ear problems.

Medical applications
Study of six species of eremophilas showed that E. duttonii had the highest antimicrobial potency, especially against gram-positive bacteria, including those that are resistant to the antibiotics meticillin and vancomycin. In another study, two diterpenes were found to be responsible for the antimicrobial activity of this species.

Use in horticulture
The species is seldom seen in cultivation. As it is difficult to propagate from both seed and cuttings, grafting on to rootsock of Myoporum species is often undertaken to produce new plants. It is slow growing and prefers a dry, well-drained sunny position. It can withstand light frosts and is very drought tolerant.

References

duttonii
Flora of New South Wales
Flora of the Northern Territory
Flora of Queensland
Flora of South Australia
Eudicots of Western Australia
Plants described in 1858
Taxa named by Ferdinand von Mueller